

17th Century

1670? Wenceslaus Hollar depicts the departure of Abraham and Lot. Lot is described in the Book of Genesis 18 and 19 as the pious heterosexual with Daughters of Lot during the fire and brimstone of Sodom and Gomorrah for homosexuality.

18th Century

19th Century

20th Century
One of the earliest activists in Czechoslovakia to fight for the equal rights of sexual minorities and the decriminalization of homosexuality was Imrich Matyáš. He started advocating for gay rights in 1919 and continued during the communist regime as well.

Homosexuality in Czechoslovakia was decriminalised in 1962.

References

See also
LGBT rights in the Czech Republic

Czech Republic
Social history of the Czech Republic